The 2018–19 Providence Friars women's basketball team represented Providence College in the 2018–19 NCAA Division I women's basketball season. The Friars, led by third year head coach Jim Crowley, played their home games at Alumni Hall and were members of the Big East Conference. They finished the season 19–16, 8–10 in Big East play to finish in a tie for sixth place. They advanced to the quarterfinals of the Big East women's tournament where they lost to DePaul. They received an at-large bid to the WNIT where they defeated Hartford and Penn in the first and second rounds before losing to Big East member Georgetown in the third round.

Roster

Schedule

|-
!colspan=9 style=| Exhibition

|-
!colspan=9 style=| Non-conference regular season

|-
!colspan=9 style=| Big East regular season

|-
!colspan=9 style=| Big East Women's Tournament

|-
!colspan=9 style=| WNIT

See also
 2018–19 Providence Friars men's basketball team

References

Providence
Providence Friars women's basketball seasons
Provide
Provide
Providence